The Moravia Community School District is a public school district headquartered northwest of Moravia, Iowa.

The district spans northern Appanoose County and southern Monroe County, with a small area in Davis County. The district serves the towns of Moravia and  Unionville, the unincorporated communities of Maine and Iconium, and the surrounding rural areas.

The school's team name is the Mohawks. Their colors are blue and white.

As of 2012, a small school district (142 students in grades 7–12), but growing in recent years.

Schools
The district operates two schools on a single campus in Moravia:
Moravia Elementary School
Moravia High School

References

External links
 Moravia Community School District

School districts in Iowa
Education in Appanoose County, Iowa
Education in Monroe County, Iowa
Education in Davis County, Iowa